Wood County is a county in the U.S. state of West Virginia. As of the 2020 census, the population was 84,296, making it West Virginia's fifth-most populous county. Its county seat is Parkersburg. The county was formed in 1798 from the western part of Harrison County and named for James Wood, governor of Virginia from 1796 to 1799.

Wood County is part of the Parkersburg-Vienna, WV Metropolitan Statistical Area.

History
Wood County was formed on December 21, 1798, from portions of Harrison County. It was named for the then Governor of Virginia (1796–99), James Wood, formerly a brigadier general in the American Revolutionary War.

In 1861, Virginia seceded from the Union. The delegates of the 40 western counties who opposed secession formed their own government and seceded from the Confederate state of Virginia. West Virginia was granted statehood in 1863.

Later that year, West Virginia's counties were divided into civil townships, with the intention of encouraging local government. This proved impractical in the heavily rural state, and in 1872 the townships were converted into magisterial districts. Wood County was divided into ten districts: Clay, Harris, Lubeck, Parkersburg, Slate, Steele, Tygart, Union, Walker, and Williams.

Geography

Wood County's northern and western boundary is the Ohio River. The Little Kanawha River flows northwestward through the county to its mouth at the Ohio River in Parkersburg. Tributaries of the Little Kanawha River in Wood County include Worthington Creek, Tygart Creek, and Walker Creek.

Major highways

Adjacent counties
 Washington County, Ohio (north)
 Pleasants County (northeast)
 Ritchie County (east)
 Wirt County (southeast)
 Jackson County (south)
 Meigs County, Ohio (southwest)
 Athens County, Ohio (west)

National protected area
 Ohio River Islands National Wildlife Refuge (part)

Demographics

2000 census
As of the census of 2000, there were 87,986 people, 36,275 households, and 24,884 families living in the county. The population density was 240 people per square mile (92/km2). There were 39,785 housing units at an average density of 108 per square mile (42/km2). The racial makeup of the county was 97.32% White, 1.01% Black or African American, 0.21% Native American, 0.51% Asian, 0.04% Pacific Islander, 0.14% from other races, and 0.77% from two or more races. 0.58% of the population were Hispanic or Latino of any race.

There were 36,275 households, out of which 29.30% had children under the age of 18 living with them, 54.30% were married couples living together, 10.80% had a female householder with no husband present, and 31.40% were non-families. 27.10% of all households were made up of individuals, and 11.50% had someone living alone who was 65 years of age or older. The average household size was 2.39 and the average family size was 2.88.

In the county, the population was spread out, with 23.00% under the age of 18, 8.00% from 18 to 24, 27.90% from 25 to 44, 25.60% from 45 to 64, and 15.50% who were 65 years of age or older. The median age was 39 years. For every 100 females there were 92.40 males. For every 100 females age 18 and over, there were 89.30 males.

The median income for a household in the county was $33,285, and the median income for a family was $40,436. Males had a median income of $34,899 versus $22,109 for females. The per capita income for the county was $18,073. About 10.60% of families and 13.90% of the population were below the poverty line, including 20.50% of those under age 18 and 8.60% of those age 65 or over.

2010 census
As of the 2010 United States Census, there were 86,956 people, 36,571 households, and 24,262 families living in the county. The racial makeup of the county was 96.4% white, 1.1% black or African American, 0.5% Asian, 0.2% American Indian, 0.2% from other races, and 1.5% from two or more races. Those of Hispanic or Latino origin made up 0.9% of the population. In terms of ancestry, 22.3% were German, 19.6% were American, 13.7% were English, and 13.6% were Irish.

Of the 36,571 households, 29.1% had children under the age of 18 living with them, 50.1% were married couples living together, 11.6% had a female householder with no husband present, 33.7% were non-families, and 28.4% of all households were made up of individuals. The average household size was 2.35 and the average family size was 2.85. The median age was 42.2 years.

The median income for a household in the county was $42,146 and the median income for a family was $52,058. Males had a median income of $42,497 versus $27,893 for females. The per capita income for the county was $22,890. About 12.3% of families and 16.4% of the population were below the poverty line, including 25.3% of those under age 18 and 7.8% of those age 65 or over.

Politics
Wood County was strongly Unionist during the Virginia Secession Convention and has been solidly Republican for most of the century and a half since. The only Democrats to win Wood County have been Samuel J. Tilden in 1876, Woodrow Wilson in 1912 and 1916, Franklin D. Roosevelt between 1932 and 1940, Harry S. Truman in 1948, and Lyndon Johnson in 1964.

Communities

Cities
 Parkersburg (county seat)
 Vienna
 Williamstown

Town
 North Hills

Magisterial districts
 Clay
 Harris
 Lubeck
 Parkersburg
 Slate
 Steele
 Tygart
 Union
 Walker
 Williams

Census-designated places
 Blennerhassett
 Boaz
 Lubeck
 Mineralwells
 Washington
 Waverly

Unincorporated communities

 Belleville
 Bonnivale
 Cedar Grove
 Central
 Eli
 Dallison
 Davisville
 Deerwalk
 Fort Neal
 Kanawha
 Mount Carmel
 New England
 Ogden
 Pettyville
 Rockport
 Slate
 Volcano
 Walker
 Wells Subdivision

See also
 Blennerhassett Island Historical State Park
 Fries Park
 National Register of Historic Places listings in Wood County, West Virginia

References

 
West Virginia counties on the Ohio River
Counties of Appalachia